Ampelocissus winkleri is a woody climbing vine, or liana in the grape family Vitaceae native to the island of Borneo. It was described botanically in 1910.

References

External links
 Specimen picture of A. winkleri from theLaboratory of Biodiversity at Kagoshima University

winkleri
Plants described in 1910
Flora of Borneo